XVideos, stylized as XVIDEOS, is a pornographic video sharing and viewing website. Founded in Paris in 2007, the website is now registered to the Czech company WGCZ Holding. , it is the most visited pornographic website and the 11th most visited website in the world.

WGCZ Holding also owns Bang Bros, DDF Network, Penthouse magazine, Private Media Group, and Erogames and has a controlling interest in the productions gathered under the Legal Porno brand.

History 
XVideos was founded in Paris in 2007 by the French owner Stephane Michael Pacaud. XVideos serves as a pornographic media aggregator, a type of website which gives access to adult content in a similar manner as YouTube does for general content. Video clips from professional videos are mixed with amateur and other types of content. By 2012, XVideos was the largest porn website in the world, with over 100 billion page views per month. Fabian Thylmann, the owner of MindGeek, attempted to purchase XVideos in 2012 in order to create a monopoly of pornographic tube sites. The French owner of XVideos turned down a reported offer of more than US$120 million by saying, "Sorry, I have to go and play Diablo II." In 2014, XVideos controversially attempted to force content providers to either pledge to renounce the right to delete videos from their accounts or to shut down their accounts immediately.

Web traffic and ranking 
, XVideos was the most visited porn website and the seventh most visited website in the world, as ranked by SimilarWeb.

XNXX, another site owned by WGCZ Holding, is the tenth most visited website overall and the second most visited website in the adult category. Both XVideos and XNXX were also the world's most visited websites for virtual reality videos in 2021.

Censorship

Algeria 
In 2019, the Algerian government banned XVideos for no stated reason, but the website remains accessible to the public via IP address spoofing.

Bangladesh 
On 19 February 2019, the Bangladeshi government blocked access to the site along with 20,000 other pornographic sites as a part of their anti-porn war.

China 
In December 2009, the Chinese authorities banned 60,000 pornographic websites.

France 
On 20 January 2022, France announced that it will be banning all pornographic websites unless they ensured their users were over 18 years of age. The appeal court rejected this ban in May 2022

India 

In 2015, the company was censored by the Indian government on a list of 857 pornographic websites, which also included non-pornographic websites such as CollegeHumor. In 2018, major Indian internet service providers also blocked access to XVideos and other porn sites.

Lebanon 
In 2014, Lebanon's Minister of Telecommunications ordered internet service providers to block six pornographic websites including XVideos. Some internet providers did not oblige, while others like Mobi DSL did.

Malaysia 
In 2015, the Malaysian government banned XVideos for violating the Communications and Multimedia Act 1998, which bans "obscene content" from being digitally distributed.

Philippines 
On 14 January 2017, President Rodrigo Duterte blocked XVideos as a part of Republic Act 9775 or the Anti-Child Pornography Law.

Russia 
After some threats, on 17 May 2022, Russia blocked XVideos and other sites.

Venezuela 
On 14 June 2018, the telecommunications and internet services company CANTV blocked access to the website without giving any statement in this regard.

Vietnam 
Since November 2019, ISPs have silently blocked access to every major pornographic website, including XVideos. Most ISPs declined to comment and denied blocking the sites. Most users assumed that this was a result of a secret Government mandate. Despite that, the sites are still accessible through the use of a VPN.

See also 
 Internet pornography
 List of most visited websites
 List of online video platforms
 Porn 2.0

References 

Gratis pornography
Czech erotica and pornography websites
Internet properties established in 2007
2007 establishments in France
Companies based in Prague
Internet censorship in India